Home Park is a neighborhood of Atlanta in Georgia, US. It is bordered on the south by Georgia Tech, on the west by the railroad yards adjacent to Marietta Street and Brady Avenue, on the north by 16th Street at Atlantic Station, and on the east by Techwood Drive at I-75/85 (the Downtown Connector).

The neighborhood is known as West Midtown Atlanta since it lies on the west side of the Downtown Connector.

The residential district is bordered by Northside Drive, Techwood Drive, 10th Street, and 16th Street. This section is also home to the media organizations CBS Atlanta WGCL-TV, Georgia Public Broadcasting and Turner Broadcasting System, Inc.

The commercial district is west of Northside Drive over to Marietta Street and Brady Avenue. It has retail and services, design firms, art galleries, restaurants and an expanding residential section along Howell Mill Road.

History

Home Park was developed in 1901 as housing for workers at the Atlantic Steel Mill located where Atlantic Station is today.

In 1970, Georgia Tech began expanding its campus north to Tenth Street and west to Northside Drive by purchasing and converting blocks of Home Park residential property for institutional use. During the 1970s and 1980s, the rapidly expanding student population exceeded campus dormitory capacity.

Over time and due to the schools' close proximity, it developed a large student population, being a popular alternative to on-campus housing at nearby institutions Georgia Tech and Georgia State University, resulting in a low owner-occupancy rate. 

The neighborhood experienced an increase in property values and land development when Atlantic Station was built. The neighborhood's commercial district experienced a corresponding growth in restaurants, retail, art galleries, services and an expanding residential base.

Businesses
The southeast corner of Fourteenth Street (Georgia 9 and U.S. 19) and Holly Street is the headquarters for Georgia Public Broadcasting. CBS-Atlanta TV station WGCL is located at 425 14th Street at Mecaslin. Turner Broadcasting System's Entertainment Group is located at 1050 Techwood Drive on the east side of Home Park.

Education
The community is zoned to Atlanta Public Schools.

Zoned schools include:
 Centennial Place Elementary School (grades K-5)
 Inman Middle School (grades 6-8)
 Midtown High School (Atlanta)

References

External links
 

Georgia Tech
Student quarters
Neighborhoods in Atlanta